Junction Spur is a rocky spur marking the eastern extremity of the Darwin Mountains and the junction of Hatherton Glacier and Darwin Glacier. It was mapped and named by the Darwin Glacier party of the Commonwealth Trans-Antarctic Expedition (1956–58).

Further reading 
 Magalhães, Catarina & Stevens, Mark & Cary, Stephen & Ball, Becky & C Storey, Bryan & Wall, Diana & Tü Rk, Roman & Ruprecht, Ulrike, At Limits of Life: Multidisciplinary Insights Reveal Environmental Constraints on Biotic Diversity in Continental Antarctica. (2012) .PLoS ONE 7(9): e44578. doi:10.1371/journal.pone.0044578

References

Ridges of Oates Land